Anything Worth Saying is the first studio album from contemporary Christian musician Aaron Shust. It was released on October 11, 2005 and peaked at No. 63 on the Billboard 200 in May 2007. The album's lead single, "My Savior My God", became a hit on Christian radio and was named Song of the Year at the 2007 GMA Dove Awards.

The album was recorded in 2004, and Shust signed a record deal with Brash Music to release it nationally thereafter.

Track listing
All songs written by Aaron Shust, except "My Savior My God" by Aaron Shust and Dora Greenwell.

Personnel 
 Aaron Shust – lead vocals, backing vocals, keyboards, acoustic guitar (1, 6, 8, 9, 11)
 Dan Hannon – keyboards, loops, loop programming, electric guitars, acoustic guitar (5, 7, 8, 12), backing vocals 
 Tim Gibson – bass 
 Jon Chalden – drums 
 Candi Pearson – backing vocals

Production 
 Dan Hannon – producer, engineer, mixing 
 Mike Shamus – executive producer 
 Jeremiah Edmund – engineer
 Steve Bishir – remixing, mastering 
 Benny Quinn – mastering
 J. Gilman – art direction, design 
 Zack Arias – photography 
 Blanton Harrell Cooke & Corazine – management 
 Recorded and Mixed at Zero Crossing Studios (Atlanta, Georgia).
 Mastered at Masterfonics (Nashville, Tennessee).

Charts

References

External links 
 Aaron Shust's official site
 Brash Records

2005 albums
Aaron Shust albums